On 7 November 2021, 19 people were killed in a large crash on the Mexican Federal Highway. A shampoo truck smashed into cars at a toll booth on the highway connecting Mexico City with Puebla, causing a large fire.

Events 
A truck travelling towards Mexico City crashed through the San Marcos Huixtoco tollbooths before colliding with many cars heading in the opposite direction. The crash precipitated a large fire that engulfed several vehicles and burned their occupants to death. The crash was caught on camera. The disaster occurred at the Plaza de Cobro San Marcos, a toll booth in the State of Mexico just east of the border with Mexico City on Mexican Federal Highway 150D.

Investigation 
Mexico's Federal Roads and Bridges and Related Services agency said the crash was caused by a brake failure.

References

See also 

 List of traffic collisions
 2021 Mexico bus crash, occurred weeks later

2021 disasters in Mexico
Road incidents in Mexico
2021 in Mexico
November 2021 events in Mexico
2020s in Mexico City
2020s road incidents in North America
2021 road incidents
Disasters in Mexico City